Sadat Hossain  (born 21 May 1984) is a Bangladeshi author, poet, screenwriter, film-maker and novelist. He described himself as a storyteller.

Early life and education
Sadat Hossain was born In Kalkini, Madaripur, Dhaka, Bangladesh. He studied anthropology at Jahangirnagar University.

Career
He was a photojournalist in a newspaper. Then the editor told him that he should write the story of those photos. Eventually, with these he published his first book in 2013 named Golpochobi. Then, he started to write the short stories. In 2014 Janalar Opashe published. In 2015 Aarshinagor is the first book when people recognize him in 2015. Besides writing he has interest in filmmaking as well. He has a  production house named ‘ASH’ Production house, released a number of visual contents like short films, dramas, music videos, documentaries etc. His novels imbued with vague idealism are often long, and melodramatic. A feature-length musical film named 'Gohiner Gaan' written and directed by him.

According to the largest online bookstore in Bangladesh, Rokomari.com, he is the bestselling fiction writer at Ekushey Book Fair for the last few years.

He is also one of the best selling writer in Bangladesh Book Fair in Kolkata, India.

He regularly writes short stories for newspaper, magazine in Bangladesh & India.

Books

Novels 
Amar ar Kothao Jaoyar Nei (আমার আর কোথাও যাওয়ার নেই) (2014) 
Aarshinagor (আরশিনগর) (2015) 
Andarmahal (অন্দরমহল) (2016) 
Manabjanam (মানবজনম) (2017) 
Nisongo Nokkhotro (নিঃসঙ্গ নক্ষত্র) (2018) 
Nirbashon (নির্বাসন) (2019) 
Ardhobrotto (অর্ধবৃত্ত) (2020) 
Megheder Din (মেঘেদের ‍দিন) (2019)  
Tomar Name Sondhya Name (তোমার নামে সন্ধ্যা নামে) (2020) 
Shesh Oddhay Nei (শেষ অধ্যায় নেই) (2020) 
Chadmabesh (ছদ্মবেশ) (2020) 
Moronattom (মরণোত্তম) (2020) 
Smritygondha (স্মৃতিগন্ধা) (2021)
Biva O Bivrom (বিভা ও বিভ্রম) (2021)
Se Ekhane Nei (সে এখানে নেই) (2021) 
Iti Smritygondha (ইতি স্মৃতিগন্ধা) (2022)
Priyotomo Osukh Se (প্রিয়তম অসুখ সে) (2022)

Story
Golpochobi (গল্পছবি) (2012) 
Janalar Opashe (জানালার ওপাশে) (2013)

Poetry 
Jete Chaile Jeo (যেতে চাইলে যেও) (2015) 
Ami Ekdin Nikhoj Hobo (আমি একদিন নিখোঁজ হবো) (2017) 
Kajol Choker Meye (কাজল চোখের মেয়ে) (2018) 
Tomake Dekhar Osukh (তোমাকে দেখার অসুখ) (2020) 
Pronoye Tumi Prarthona Hou (প্রণয়ে তুমি প্রার্থনা হও) (2021)

Films

Feature 
 Gohiner Gaan (2019), writing and direction.

Documentary 
 The Legend Syed Abdul Hadi, writing and direction.

Shorts 
Bodh
The Shoes

Awards
Best Director, Bangladesh Short and Documentary Film Festival 2016
 Chamber International Award
SBSP-RP Foundation Literature Award
 Humayun Ahmed Literary Award 2019
 Cokh Literary Award 1426 
Shuvojon Literary Award 2019 
Marvel of Tomorrow Influencers Award 2021 - Writer 
Kali O Kalam Tarun Kabi O Lekhak Puraskar 2021 (Fiction)

References

Bangladeshi male novelists
Bengali-language writers
21st-century novelists
21st-century male writers
Living people
1984 births
Jahangirnagar University alumni
Bangladeshi male poets
21st-century Bangladeshi poets
Bangladeshi film producers
Bangladeshi film directors
21st-century Bangladeshi writers
Bangladeshi photojournalists
Bangladeshi screenwriters